Peter Steigman Albin (December 20, 1934 – February 20, 2008) was an American economist who wrote and taught primarily in New York City. Among other contributions, he was known for applying cellular automata in the social sciences.

Career
Peter S. Albin  earned his BA, from Yale College in 1956 and Ph.D from Princeton in 1964, both in economics.

He was a professor of economics at New York University from 1960 to 1974, and Chairman of the Economics Department of John Jay College of the City University of New York from 1974 to 1991.  He taught and performed research at the Levy Economics Institute. He was visiting professor at the University of Göttingen in 1979–1980, the University of California, Berkeley in 1972–1973, he taught at the Sorbonne, at Cambridge University (1968–1969), at the Institute of Advanced Studies (Vienna) (1977–1979).

Additionally, he was a partner in the asset management and investment advisory firm, the Unicorn Group, for many years.

Writings

Books

(with Duncan K. Foley) Barriers and Bounds to Rationality:essays on economic complexity and dynamics in interactive systems" 	Princeton, N.J. : Princeton University Press, 1998. . Held at 257 WorldCat libraries  Progress Without Poverty: Socially Responsible Economic Growth New York: Basic Books, 1978 . Held at 465 World Cat libraries 
"The Analysis of Complex Socio-Economic Systems" 	Lexington, Mass. : Lexington Books, [1975].  Held at 265 WorldCat libraries  

Journal articles
His articles have appeared in the American Economic Review, the Journal of Economic Literature, and many other publications.

References

External links
 , obituary
  Peter Albin at the National Library of Australia
  Unbalanced Growth and Intensification of the Urban Crisis A paper at Sage
  Individual Strategy and Social Structure: An Evolutionary Theory of Institution''

1934 births
2008 deaths
Economists from New York (state)
American essayists
American male essayists
American political writers
Cellular automatists
Yale College alumni
Princeton University alumni
City University of New York faculty
University of California, Berkeley faculty
Academic staff of the University of Paris
Academics of the University of Cambridge
Writers from New York City
20th-century American economists
20th-century essayists
20th-century American male writers